Noah Keen (October 10, 1920 – March 24, 2019) was an American film and television actor.

Early life 
Keen was born in Cincinnati, Ohio,and was raised there with his brother Buddy and also had a sister, Helen Keen.  

He fought in World War II as a bombardier in the Army Air Force  and received a Purple Heart during this time.

Career 
Keen made many guest appearances in television series such as The Twilight Zone in the episodes "The Arrival" and "The Trade-Ins". In 1962 he made two guest appearances on Perry Mason; first as murder victim Harlow Phipps in "The Case of the Crippled Cougar", then as Dr. Stephen Grant in "The Case of the Lurid Letter".  In 1962 Keen appeared as Samuel Cole on the TV western The Virginian in the episode titled "The Accomplice". 

Other series on which he made guest appearances include The Eleventh Hour, Judd for the Defense, Bonanza, Mission: Impossible, The Mod Squad, The Waltons and The Rockford Files. Keen had also appeared in movies such as Battle for the Planet of the Apes and Disorganized Crime. Although he had been acting less frequently since the 1980s, he still made occasional appearances such as a guest appearance on the episode "Johnny Cakes" of The Sopranos.

Personal life
Keen was married to screenwriter Barbara Corday. He had a daughter with one of his wives. He was married to Gerrianne Raphael in 2004 and had a very happy marriage. Through that marriage, Keen became step-father to three more girls. He had five grandchildren, two from his biological daughter, two from one of his step-daughters, and one from his other step-daughter.

Late life
 
Keen moved from California to New York when he married Raphael and they lived in Harlem until he died. 

Keen often participated in small acting roles until he was almost 94.

Keen died on March 24, 2019, aged 98.

Filmography

References

External links
 
 
 

1920 births
2019 deaths
American male television actors
American male film actors
Male actors from Cincinnati